The Kazakhstan National Time Trial Championships are held annually to decide the Kazakh cycling champions in the individual time trial discipline, across various categories.

Multiple winners 
Riders that won the race more than once.

Men

See also
 Kazakhstan National Road Race Championships

References

Cycle races in Kazakhstan
National road cycling championships